Kalamkar may refer to:
Kalamkar, a printed textile produced using the Kalamkari technique
Kalamkar, an Indian surname associated with the Mali caste, and prominent in the city of Baner
Abhishek Kalamkar, Mayor of Ahmednagar 20152016